Harry Lawrence was a South African politician.

Harry Lawrence may also refer to:

 Harry Lawrence, publisher of The Reporter (Belize)
 Harry Lawrence (American football) (c. 1909 – 1987), American football coach
 Harry Lawrence (curler) in 1983 Labatt Brier

See also
 Harry Lawrence Bradfer-Lawrence (1887–1965), antiquarian
 
 Harold Lawrence (1887–?), politician in Manitoba, Canada
 Henry Lawrence (disambiguation)